Cyril Henry Carrington Harmer (1903–1986) was a British auctioneer and philatelist, whose stamp collection has been described as "world famous".

He specialised in collecting 'Newfoundland Airmails'. His collection was sold, by his family firm of auctioneers, Harmers, in West London, on 26 February 2002, for £803,000. He also co-authored a book on air mail stamps.

He appeared as a castaway on the BBC Radio programme Desert Island Discs on 4 August 1969, and in the same year was added to the Philatelic Congress of Great Britain's Roll of Distinguished Philatelists.

Bibliography

References 

1903 births
Place of birth missing
1986 deaths
Place of death missing
British philatelists
Signatories to the Roll of Distinguished Philatelists
Philatelic auctioneers